Ringhand is a surname. Notable people with the surname include:

 Janis Ringhand (born 1950), American politician
 Lori Ringhand, American legal scholar

See also
 Ringhaddy
 Ringland (disambiguation)